Cowmire Hall is a country house near Crosthwaite in Cumbria, England. The hall, the garden wall and gate piers are recorded in the National Heritage List for England as a designated Grade II* listed building.

History
The hall was originally built as a tower house in the early 16th century probably for the Briggs family. It was acquired by the Newby family in the late 17th century and was extended and remodelled by Richard Fleming, a son of Sir Daniel Fleming, in the 1690s. It was owned by the Carruthers family until 1934. It was then owned by Major and Mrs Gordon until 1966 and has since been acquired by the Barrett family who use it as a home and have converted a farm building into a damson gin cellar.

See also

Grade II* listed buildings in South Lakeland
Listed buildings in Crosthwaite and Lyth

References

Country houses in Cumbria
Grade II* listed buildings in Cumbria